Süderholz is a municipality in the Vorpommern-Rügen district, in Mecklenburg-Vorpommern, Germany. It was created as a merger from several municipalities on 1 January 1999 (indicated in italics) and comprises the following villages:

References